Buna is a village in Oro Province, Papua New Guinea. It was the site in part, of the Battle of Buna–Gona during World War II, when it constituted a variety of native huts and a handful of houses with an airstrip. Buna was the trailhead to the Kokoda Track leading to  Kokoda.

History
Buna was the site of a handful of houses, a dozen or so native huts, and an airfield acting as a trailhead up the Kokoda Track to the foothills village of Kokoda (see Kokoda Track campaign).

During World War II, Imperial Japanese troops invaded on 21–22 July 1942 and established it as a base (see Buna Airfield). Six months later,<ref
name="Caesar1">William Manchester, "American Caesar", 1978, Little Brown Company, 793 pages, </ref> Buna was recaptured by the Australian and American armies during the Battle of Buna-Gona on 2 January 1943 during the New Guinea campaign in the South West Pacific Area. The Fifth Air Force established air bases there as the Allied counter-offensive against Japan picked up the pace and continued operations to isolate the major Japanese base at Rabaul and attack Lae and points west.

For weeks at a time General Douglas MacArthur, commander in the South Pacific, used Buna as an informal forward base. MacArthur's biographer William Manchester relates a story how Allied commanding air officer Lt. General George Kenney loved repeating of how he'd gone back to Australia for a week, and MacArthur had stolen his house, claiming it was cooler at night than his own. A week later the Monsoon winds shifted, making MacArthurs' old house now the cooler— and he never asked for Kenney to switch back.

References

Populated places in Oro Province